Kaleva Hall is a historic Finnish-American clubhouse in Virginia, Minnesota, United States.  It was operated by the Valon Tuote temperance society from its construction around 1906 until the late 1960s, after which it was acquired by the Knights and Ladies of Kaleva.  The building was listed on the National Register of Historic Places in 1980 under its Finnish name Valon Tuote Raittiusseura for its local significance in the themes of education, entertainment/recreation, and social history.  It was nominated for continuously serving as the headquarters of one of the city's major ethnic groups throughout the 20th century.

Description
Kaleva Hall is a rectangular, two-story building constructed of brick.  Columnar brick buttresses divide the front façade into two bays and the side elevations into four bays.  The building has a steeply pitched hip roof with an additional roof feature over the main entrance in the form of a squared-off bell.  Some decorative brickwork creates a frieze just below the eaves.

See also
 National Register of Historic Places listings in St. Louis County, Minnesota

References

1906 establishments in Minnesota
Buildings and structures in Virginia, Minnesota
Clubhouses on the National Register of Historic Places in Minnesota
Cultural infrastructure completed in 1906
Finnish-American culture in Minnesota
Finnish-American history
National Register of Historic Places in St. Louis County, Minnesota